Hale Baugh (September 10, 1924 – November 16, 2011) was an American modern pentathlete. He competed at the 1948 Summer Olympics. He was the father of golfer Laura Baugh.

References

1924 births
2011 deaths
American male modern pentathletes
Olympic modern pentathletes of the United States
Modern pentathletes at the 1948 Summer Olympics
Sportspeople from Omaha, Nebraska
Sportspeople from Nebraska
People from Cocoa, Florida
20th-century American people